Bridge of Light is an album of contemporary classical music written by Keith Jarrett and performed by Jarrett with The Fairfield Orchestra conducted by Thomas Crawford. It was recorded in March 1993 and released by ECM Records in April 1994.

Original notes 
Original notes by Keith Jarrett can be found in the CD issues:

Reception
The Allmusic review by Richard S. Ginell awarded the album 4 stars, stating: 

Writing for jazz.com, Ted Gioia gave the track "Bridge of Light" a rating of 95/100 and praised it:

Track listing
All compositions by Keith Jarrett
 Elegy for Violin and String Orchestra (1984) - 14:50 Michelle Makarski: violin
 Adagio for Oboe and String Orchestra (1984) - 9:54 Marcia Butler: oboe
 Sonata for Violin and Piano (1984) - 27:11 Celebration - 6:15Song - 7:00Dance - 3:09Birth - 8:34 Dance - 2:13 Michelle Makarski: violinKeith Jarrett: piano
 Bridge of Light for Viola and Orchestra (1990) - 17:01 Patricia McCarty: viola

Personnel
 Keith Jarrett – piano, production
 Marcia Butler - oboe
 Michelle Makarski - violin
 Patricia McCarty - viola
 The Fairfield Orchestra conducted by Thomas Crawford
 violins: Aloysia Friedmann, Cenovia Cummins, Mary Whitaker, Andrew Schaw, Alexander Vselensky, Heidi Modr, Christopher Cardona, Dana Friedli, Susan Lorentsen, Eric DeGioia, Roxanne Bergrman, Jeffrey Ellenberger, Amy Wright, Peter Kupfer
 violas: Ah Ling Neu, Adrian Benjamin, KC Still, Caryn Briskin
 violoncellos: Ted Mook, Maureen McDermott, Benjamin Whittenburg
 double basses: Michael Magee, Neil Garber
 flute: Adrianne Greenbaum
 horn: Kirsten Bendixen
 trumpet: Susan Radcliff

Production
 Manfred Eicher - producer
 Peter Laenger - tonmeister
 Barbara Wojirsch - cover design
 Gene Martin - photographer

References 

ECM Records albums
Keith Jarrett albums
1993 albums
Albums produced by Manfred Eicher